The Puli Basins are a group of several small basins located across the mountainous area of Nantou in central Taiwan. The group includes the Yuchih Basin (魚池盆地), Jihyuehtan Basin (日月潭盆地), Toushe Basin (頭社盆地), Chungkui Basin (銃櫃盆地), Lienhuachih Basin (蓮華池盆地) and Puli Basin (埔里盆地) proper, the largest of the group. Generally speaking, the singular term "Puli Basin" also refers to the whole group of basins.

Drainage basins of Taiwan
Landforms of Nantou County